Boronia pilosa, commonly known as the hairy boronia, is a plant in the citrus family Rutaceae and is endemic to south-eastern Australia. It is an erect, woody shrub with hairy branches, pinnate, sometimes hairy leaves and groups of up to ten white to pink, four petalled flowers.

Description
The flowers are white to pink and are arranged in groups of mostly between three and six in leaf axils or on the ends of the branches. The eight stamens are hairy. Flowering occurs from August to February.

Taxonomy and naming
Boronia pilosa was first formally described in 1805 by Jacques Labillardière who published the description in  Novae Hollandiae Plantarum Specimen. The specific epithet (pilosa) is a Latin word meaning "hairy".

In 2003, Marco Duretto described four subspecies and the names are accepted by the Australian Plant Census:
 Boronia pilosa subsp. parvidaemonis;
 Boronia pilosa subsp. pilosa;
 Boronia pilosa subsp. tasmanensis;
 Boronia pilosa subsp. torquata.

Distribution and habitat
Hairy boronia grows in woodland and heath, sometimes in exposed areas and is found in Victoria, Tasmania and South Australia.

References

pilosa
Flora of Victoria (Australia)
Flora of Tasmania
Plants described in 1805
Taxa named by Jacques Labillardière